October 2 - Eastern Orthodox liturgical calendar - October 4

All fixed commemorations below celebrated on October 16 by Eastern Orthodox Churches on the Old Calendar.

For October 3rd, Orthodox Churches on the Old Calendar commemorate the Saints listed on September 20.

Saints
 Hieromartyr Dionysius of Athens, Bishop of Athens, and with him the priest Rusticus and the deacon Eleutherius, martyrs (96)
 Saint Damaris of Athens, a disciple of St. Dionysius of Athens (1st century)  (see also: October 2)
 Hieromartyrs Dionysius, Bishop of Alexandria, and eight other martyrs including the Deacons Gaius, Faustus, Eusebius and Chaeremon (c. 265)
 Martyr Theoctistus, by the sword.
 Martyr Theagenes, by fire.
 Martyr Theoteknos, by stoning.
 Saint Adauctus.  (see also: October 4)
 Saint John the Chozebite, Bishop of Caesarea in Palestine (532)
 Blessed Hesychius the Silent, of Mt. Horeb (6th century)

Pre-Schism Western saints
 Saint Candidus, a martyr in Rome, buried on the Esquiline Hill.
 Saint Menna (Manna), a holy virgin from Lorraine in France, related to Sts Eucherius and Elaptius (c. 395)
 Saint Maximian, a convert from Donatism, he became Bishop of Bagaia in Numidia in North Africa (404)
 Saint Cyprian of Toulon, a monk at St Victor at Marseilles and Bishop of Toulon in France (6th century)
 Hieromartyrs Hewald the White (Ewald the Fair) and Hewald the Black (Ewald the Dark), at Cologne  (c. 695)
 Saint Widradus (Waré), restorer of the monastery of Flavigny near Dijon in France, also founded the monastery of Saulieu (747)
 Saint Utto, founder of Metten Abbey (of the Benedictine Order) in Bavaria in Germany (829)
 Saint Gérard of Brogne, Abbot of Brogne (959)
 Saint Froilan, Bishop of Léon (1006)

Post-Schism Orthodox saints
 Venerable Dionysius of the Kiev Caves, recluse (15th century)

New Martys and Confessors
 New Hiero-confessor Agathangelus (Preobrazhensky), Metropolitan of Yaroslavl (1928)

Other commemorations
 Trubchevsk Icon of the Mother of God (1765), located in the Troitse-Scanov Convent.
 Repose of Blessed Olga, Fool-for-Christ, of Bogdanoya Bari and St. Petersburg (1960)
 Repose of Elder Ieronymos the Cappadocian of Aegina (Jerome of Aegina) (1966)
 Uncovering of the relics (1988) of St. Joseph (Litovkin), Elder of Optina Monastery (1911)
 The Holy Synod of the Patriarchate of Constantinople resolved (on October 3, 2019) to glorify seven New Martyrs of Kastoria:
 New Martyr Markos Markoulis of Kleisoura, Kastoria, hanged in Argos Orestiko (1598)
 New Martyr Ioannis Noultzos, martyred together with his brother and brother-in-law in Kastoria (1696)
 New Martyr George of Kastoria, martyred by the Hagarenes in the Acarnania region. 
 New Hieromartyr Vasilios Kalapaliki, priest of Chiliodendro, Kastoria (gr) (1902)
 New Hieromartyr Archimandrite Platon (Aivazidis), Protosyncellus of Metropolitan Germanos Karavangelis (1921)

Icon gallery

Notes

References

Sources 
 October 3/16. Orthodox Calendar (PRAVOSLAVIE.RU).
 October 16 / October 3. HOLY TRINITY RUSSIAN ORTHODOX CHURCH (A parish of the Patriarchate of Moscow).
 October 3. OCA - The Lives of the Saints.
 The Autonomous Orthodox Metropolia of Western Europe and the Americas (ROCOR). St. Hilarion Calendar of Saints for the year of our Lord 2004. St. Hilarion Press (Austin, TX). p. 73.
 The Third Day of the Month of October. Orthodoxy in China.
 October 3. Latin Saints of the Orthodox Patriarchate of Rome.
 The Roman Martyrology. Transl. by the Archbishop of Baltimore. Last Edition, According to the Copy Printed at Rome in 1914. Revised Edition, with the Imprimatur of His Eminence Cardinal Gibbons. Baltimore: John Murphy Company, 1916. p. 305.
 Rev. Richard Stanton. A Menology of England and Wales, or, Brief Memorials of the Ancient British and English Saints Arranged According to the Calendar, Together with the Martyrs of the 16th and 17th Centuries. London: Burns & Oates, 1892. pp. 473–474.

 Greek Sources
 Great Synaxaristes:  3 ΟΚΤΩΒΡΙΟΥ. ΜΕΓΑΣ ΣΥΝΑΞΑΡΙΣΤΗΣ.
  Συναξαριστής. 3 Οκτωβρίου. ECCLESIA.GR. (H ΕΚΚΛΗΣΙΑ ΤΗΣ ΕΛΛΑΔΟΣ).
  03/10/2016. Ορθόδοξος Συναξαριστής.

 Russian Sources
  16 октября (3 октября). Православная Энциклопедия под редакцией Патриарха Московского и всея Руси Кирилла (электронная версия). (Orthodox Encyclopedia - Pravenc.ru).
  3 октября по старому стилю / 16 октября по новому стилю. Русская Православная Церковь - Православный церковный календарь на 2016 год.

October in the Eastern Orthodox calendar